The RT 125 was a German two-stroke motorcycle made by DKW in Zschopau in the 1930s, IFA and MZ in the 1950s and early 1960s, and DKW in Ingolstadt in the 1950s and 1960s. "RT" stands for "Reichstyp" or "National Model".

In the 1930s DKW pioneered the Schnürle two-stroke loop scavenging process to dispense with the use of a deflector piston and improve efficiency of the combustion chamber. DKW also developed a highly efficient arrangement of transfer ports. These two features were included in the RT 125 to great commercial advantage. Competitor companies such as Adler and TWN copied the adoption of flat-topped pistons and strove to develop equally efficient transfer port arrangements without infringing DKW's patent.

Copies and variants
Copies of the RT 125 were built by at least eight different entities in at least six countries.

War reparations

After World War II the Soviet Union took plans, tooling and even several dozen personnel as war reparations to MMZ in Moscow (later transferred to MMVZ and SMZ) and to a factory in Kovrov, and produced copies of the RT 125 as the M1A Moskva and K-125 respectively. WFM of Poland made a modified version of the RT 125 (under SHL 125 and Sokół 125 brands), developed into 125/175 cc family motorcycles, produced until 1985.

RT 125 plans were also taken to the United Kingdom where they became the basis of the BSA Bantam, and to the USA where they formed the basis of the Harley-Davidson "Hummer" (Hummer is really just a few specific years, but generally people call the Harley lightweights Hummers).

Postwar German production: DKW and MZ
After the Second World War, DKW's factories in Zschopau were in the Soviet occupation zone. As such, they were under the control of the Soviet Union until they were handed over to the government of East Germany. The factory continued production of the RT 125 under the MZ (Motorradwerk Zschopau) brand into the 1950s.

Meanwhile, DKW had reorganized itself in Ingolstadt, where it began production of the RT 125W (for "West") in 1949.  Variants of the RT 125W, usually with larger engines, were in production throughout the 1950s.

Yamaha YA-1

In the 1950s, after reestablishing themselves as manufacturers of musical instruments, Nippon Gakki decided to use the manufacturing equipment left over from wartime production to make motorcycles. Since the copyright on the RT 125 had been voided by the Allies, the company reverse engineered it as the basis for their first motorcycle. Nippon Gakki formed the Yamaha Motor Company in 1955 to build their copy of the RT 125 as the Yamaha YA-1, which was in production from 1955 to 1958.

References

RT 125
Motorcycles introduced in the 1930s
Two-stroke motorcycles